Jennifer Kristen Korbee (née Peterson-Hind; born May 24, 1980) is an American singer, songwriter, actress and former childish cheerleader.

Biography

Korbee was born Jennifer Peterson-Hind in Manchester, IA. Upon receiving her Bachelor of Fine Arts in musical theatre from the University of Cincinnati – College-Conservatory of Music, she moved to New York City and was cast in a regional production of the Off-Broadway musical The Marvelous Wonderettes.

In 2002, Korbee was cast in the children's show Hi-5 in the role of her nickname "Jenn".  The show was filmed in Sydney, Australia. Other cast members include Kimee Balmilero, Karla Cheatham Mosley, Curtis Cregan, and Shaun Taylor-Corbett. Korbee has been cast as Cathy in the musical adaptation of Wuthering Heights, written by Mark Ryan. She has also appeared in productions of the professional regional theatre company American Folklore Theatre.

Korbee and her husband Tom participated on the eighth season of American Idol as the first married couple to make it to Hollywood; Tom was eliminated at the end of group round while she was eliminated at the final judgment following a sing-off with Kristen McNamara.

She appeared as the newscaster in the 2011 film Judy Moody and the Not Bummer Summer starring Heather Graham.

She and her husband Tom formed the duo Korbee. In 2016, the duo's single 'Hey Child', produced by David Garcia and executive produced by Mark Endert, debuted to over 5M streams on Spotify.

Discography
Her duo, Korbee, released single 'Hey Child' produced by David Garcia and Mark Endert which debuted to over 5 million streams on Spotify.

Filmography

References

External links
 Korbee's Official Website
Jennifer Korbee's official website

1980 births
Actresses from Wisconsin
American Idol participants
American women pop singers
American television actresses
American children's musicians
Living people
Actors from Madison, Wisconsin
Singers from Wisconsin
University of Cincinnati – College-Conservatory of Music alumni
21st-century American women singers
21st-century American singers